VC Vlissingen is a Dutch football team based in Vlissingen, playing in the Hoofdklasse.

During the two seasons it spent as a professional team in the Eerste Divisie, the team was known as VCV Zeeland. Players during the professional years include Emiel Dorst, Harry van den Ham, and Peter van Vossen.

References

External links
 Official website
Soccerway profile

 
Football clubs in the Netherlands
Football clubs in Vlissingen